Rundvatnet is a lake that lies in the municipality of Sørfold in Nordland county, Norway. The lake Sisovatnet lies immediately west of Rundvatnet; they are connected by the narrow Rundvasstraumen strait.

See also
 List of lakes in Norway
 Geography of Norway

References

Sørfold
Lakes of Nordland